is the tenth video game in the Contra series published by Konami. It was developed by Team Neo Kijirushi, a group of staff members within Konami Computer Entertainment Tokyo, and released for the PlayStation 2 in 2004. The game is a direct follow-up to Contra: Shattered Soldier, but returns to the multidirectional shooting format and departs from the traditional scrolling shooter formula used in previous games. It was the first game in the series to receive an ''M'' rating from the ESRB and was the only installment to receive said rating until the release of Rogue Corps in 2019.

Gameplay
Neo Contra once again brings the games back into three dimensions. However, unlike the titles developed under Appaloosa Interactive, players only need to aim in the third dimension on rare occasions. Additionally, this title eradicates the boss-oriented gameplay of Hard Corps and the previous 32-bit titles, and seeks a balance more reminiscent of the 8-bit and SNES Contra games; long free-form shooting sections, inter-spliced with boss encounters.

Additionally, gameplay varies depending on the level and camera angle presented (the camera cannot be user-controlled). Most of the game is played from an isometric perspective, but portions are side-scrolling or overhead-behind. The player cannot jump. Instead, two new defensive moves are added that allow the player to effectively evade in the new dimensions: dash and spin. Dash gives the player a quick burst of speed to evade hostiles, while spin gives the player an instance of invulnerability. The hit-ratio system that was introduced in Shattered Soldier has been kept in this title.

The game uses a modified version of the three-weapon configuration from Shattered Soldier. The player has two types of firearms used against ground-level targets, one with regular ammo, the other with flammable rounds, and a third weapon used to lock on to airborne targets. The player can choose from one of the three initially available weapon sets (one which includes the famous Spread Shot from the earlier Contra games, which was missing in Shattered Soldier), with four additional sets that are time-release. The Type F configuration features the GV Laser and Ripple Laser, both weapons from Gradius V.

The weapon sets can be variated from the weaponry depending on the character used since Katana Jaguar uses his katana sword in all his sets. 

Sets available are:

Type A: Machine Gun, Grenade Launcher, and Lock-On Missile.

Type B: Charge Shot, Fire Whip. and Lock-On Laser.

Type C: Spread Shot, Fireball. and Lock-On Thunder.

Type D: Lightning, G.Bazooka, and Heaven Laser.

Type E: Drill Shot, Reflect Laser, and Fairy Laser.

Type F: Ripple Laser, GV Laser, and Variable Weapon.

There are a total of seven stages in the game. Like Shattered Soldier, the four initial stages can be played in any order and be replayed anytime for higher grading. The fifth stage can only be selected by clearing the first four stages, while the sixth and seventh stages are only available if players maintain an above-average grade overall. There is a difficulty setting in the options menu, and playing on Easy difficulty grants players 30 lives to beat the first four missions, but on this difficulty, it is impossible to view the game's ending. Normal mode offers players 5 lives and 7 continues to complete the game's seven missions.

Neo Contra also marks the return of the time limit from some versions of the original Contra games, with the last third of the sixth stage granting the player such to complete the mission. Unlike the timed missions in the original Contra where the player loses one life once the time limit drops to zero, the entire game is over once the player is unable to complete the last part of the sixth stage within the said time limit.

Plot
Neo Contra takes place during A.D. 4444 when the Earth has been transformed into a prison planet, home to criminals and political rebels. From this underworld society rises a new order called "Neo Contra". This government quickly showed its true colors, as it has other plans than bringing back normal civilization. Carrying out this new threat are four renegade Contras (elite warriors), who are called the Four Elite, united under the command of mysterious Master Contra. Thus, Bill Rizer is partnered with Genbei "Jaguar" Yagyu, a samurai, and the two are sent to Earth to deal with the Neo Contra threat. After defeating the Four Elite, the heroes discover the truth behind "Neo Contra", which is a facade for "Project C", a plan to create half-human AI from Bill Rizer's DNA, as an ultimate weapon, which is now Master Contra. Bill Rizer himself is just a clone of the original one, a side-objective of "Project C". With the help of Mystery G, an elder Contra operative, the heroes managed to defeat Master Contra and put an end to "Project C".

Cast
Bill Rizer - Bill, the supreme Contra warrior, is once again awoken from his cryogenic sleep of nearly two thousand years. He is now ordered to destroy the "Neo Contra" threat, a new organization that poses a much deeper threat to the world. He is, in fact, a clone of the original Bill Rizer, a result of the military "Project C".
Genbei "Jaguar" Yagyu - A samurai Contra, who is Bill's new partner. A mysterious dark-skinned humanoid alien (or African American) in the forty-fifth century who follows the code of the Samurai. He is the only character able to wield the Katana, the most powerful weapon in the game. The character is based on the real-life black samurai Yasuke from the Sengoku period of Feudal Japan history.
The Four Hell Warriors of Neo Contra - The four elite members of the "Neo Contra" organization:
Guerilla Contra: the pipe-smoking military commander.
Plant Contra: the plant/cyborg hybrid.
Pheromone Contra: Lucia (aka Bionoid LCR), who once assisted Bill during the events of Contra: Shattered Soldier.
Animal Contra: the talking bull terrier.
Mystery G - A mysterious elderly Contra operative. While not openly confirmed in the game, it is acknowledged that Mystery G is the actual Bill Rizer, having survived for centuries.
Master Contra - The leader of "Neo Contra" and a threat to humanity. He is, in fact, the main result of "Project C": the ultimate war machine, a bionic AI, which consists of the original Bill Rizer's DNA and consciousness combined with cybernetics and weapons of mass destruction.

Reception

Neo Contra received mixed reviews from Metacritic and Gamerankings.

References

External links
 Japanese website

2004 video games
PlayStation 2 games
PlayStation Network games
Contra (series)
Fiction set in the 5th millennium
Video game sequels
Video games about cloning
Video games about terrorism
Video games developed in Japan
Video games with isometric graphics
Cooperative video games